Günther's whipsnake, Burmese vine snake or river vine snake (Ahaetulla fronticincta) is a species of snake found in bushes and other low vegetation along tidal rivers and mangrove in coastal parts of Myanmar (Burma). There are also old records from neighbouring northeastern India (Assam and Darjeeling), but these are considered questionable and it has not been located there during recent surveys. It is generally common in appropriate habitats within its known range.

This diurnal, mildly venomous snake feeds only on fish. It is ovoviviparous.

Food
This snake feeds only on fish. It strikes at a fish in water while maintaining half of its body wrapped around a branch or twig. The mild venom of this snake renders the fish immobile.

References

 Boulenger, George A. 1890 The Fauna of British India, Including Ceylon and Burma. Reptilia and Batrachia. Taylor & Francis, London, xviii, 541 pp.
 Günther, A. 1858 Catalogue of Colubrine snakes of the British Museum. London, I - XVI, 1 - 281

External links

 https://web.archive.org/web/20050820052019/http://www.calacademy.org/calwild/2003spring/stories/wildlives.html

Ahaetulla
Reptiles of Myanmar
Snakes of Asia
Reptiles described in 1858
Taxa named by Albert Günther